Bangor International Airport  is a joint civil-military public airport on the west side of the city of Bangor, in Penobscot County, Maine, United States. Formerly a military installation known as Dow Air Force Base, Bangor International Airport remains home to the 101st Air Refueling Wing of the Maine Air National Guard, although most of the Air Force's aircraft and personnel left in the late 1960s. BGR covers 2,079 acres (841 ha) of land.

The airport owes its prosperity to its location on major air corridors between Europe and the East Coast of the United States.

Bangor International is operated as an "enterprise fund", which means that the expense of operating it comes from airport revenue. Revenues are generated by air service operations, resident aviation-related industrial companies, real estate, cargo, international charter flights, and corporate/general aviation traffic.  One of three international airports in the state, it serves the residents of central, eastern, and northern Maine as well as parts of Canada.

It was designated by NASA as an emergency landing location for the Space Shuttle.

History

20th century
Bangor International Airport began as Godfrey Field in 1921, on land owned by local attorney Edward Rawson Godfrey (1877–1958). On August 19, 1923, 15 Martin Bombers and 11 DeHaviland Scout Planes under the command of Gen. Billy Mitchell — virtually the entire U.S. Army Air Corps — landed there on a practice mission.

Regular air passenger service to Portland and Boston was begun in 1931 by Boston-Maine Airways, owned by the Boston and Maine and Bangor and Aroostook railroads and under contract to Pan American, which was interested in the airport as a stop on its planned intercontinental air route between the U.S. and Europe. Amelia Earhart was a celebrity pilot on some of the earliest flights for Boston-Maine Airways in the 1930s. The airport was equipped with floodlights for night flights as early as 1937. In 1940, Boston-Maine became Northeast Airlines, which eventually merged with Delta Air Lines in 1972.

1941 saw the first fatal crash of a military aircraft in Maine, when a Douglas B-18 Bolo bomber stationed at Bangor Army Airfield went down in nearby Springfield, killing all four crew. Between 1941 and 1971, there were 14 additional fatal crashes of military aircraft based in Bangor, three within city limits and the rest in small towns or wilderness areas between the north woods and the coast.

Just before World War II, Godfrey Field was taken over by the Army Air Corps and became the Bangor Army Air Field. It was operated until 1968 as Dow Air Force Base, and still later as Bangor Air National Guard Base.

In 1948, Bangor was one stop on the round-the-world flight of Richarda Morrow-Tait, the first woman to pilot a plane around the globe. She landed at Dow but took off for the next leg (to Canada) from the airport in nearby Old Town. The Canadian authorities refused her permission to hop the Atlantic and ordered her back to Bangor. She defied them and completed the trip.

In the 1950s and 1960s, Bangor was a destination for Northeast Airlines before its merger into Delta. Northeast usually used the Douglas DC-6 for service between Bangor and Boston and New York. In 1965, there was still a single weekly DC-3 flight to Bangor operated by Northeast Airlines.

In 1968, Dow AFB was closed as an active duty Air Force installation. Most of the base was purchased by the city and reopened the following year as Bangor International Airport. The portion of Dow AFB not turned over to the city became the basis for the current Air National Guard Base and the Maine Army National Guard's Army Aviation Support Facility.

In October 1969, Trans World Airlines Flight 85 which had been hijacked in California refueled in Bangor on its way to Rome, where the hijacker was captured.

From the 1970s into the 1990s, the airport attracted 3,000 to 5,000 commercial flights a year, mostly charter jetliners flying between Europe and the West Coast of the United States, or the Caribbean and Mexico. Bangor was a logical refueling stop, and as a U.S. port of entry, passengers could go through customs and immigration checks while their plane was being serviced. Travelers from every part of the world mingled in the airport lounge — from the French & Belgian contingents of the Elvis Presley Fan Club on their way to Memphis to President José López Portillo of Mexico on his way to Moscow with members of his military staff. Laker Airways, World Airways, Lot Polish Airlines, Aeroméxico, British Airways, Balair, Condor Airlines, LTU International, Capitol International Airways, Aeroflot, and Pan American were a few of the companies whose livery became common in the skies above Bangor. Finnair briefly used Bangor as a hub for regularly scheduled daily flights.

Bangor also had mainline scheduled jets on Northeast Airlines, and subsequently Delta in the 1970s with flights to Portland and Boston. By the 1980s, USAir and United also began mainline service into BGR. Continental briefly had 1 mainline MD-80 jet to Newark in 1991–1992 to complement their propjet Continental Express service to Newark and Presque Isle.

In 1977, Erwin Kreuz, a 50-year-old West German brewery worker on his way to San Francisco, stepped off a refueling charter flight in the mistaken belief that he had reached his destination. Speaking no English, he spent four frustrating days in Bangor looking for San Francisco landmarks before realizing he was not in California. When his story made local and then national news, Bangorians were so delighted with his error that he received the key to the city, met the Governor of Maine, was made an honorary member of the Penobscot Indian tribe, received a marriage proposal, and was even given a gift of local land.  The San Francisco Chronicle paid his way to California, where he was similarly feted, and he was invited back to Bangor the following year to help open the Bangor Mall.

In 1992, it was the launch site for the Chrysler Trans-Atlantic Challenge Balloon Race. The Belgians won, but the American team, taking a more southerly track to avoid inclement weather, inadvertently became the first to pilot a balloon from North America to Africa, landing just east of Casablanca, Morocco, setting new endurance and distance records in the process.

In October 1995, Vice President Al Gore and Russian Prime Minister Viktor Chernomyrdin held a brief summit at the airport to discuss economic cooperation.

Bangor has been the port of entry for over a million servicemen and women returning from the Gulf War, the Iraq and Afghanistan wars, and the NATO operations IFOR and SFOR in Bosnia and Herzegovina on military charters. Starting in 1991, a combination of local veterans and interested citizens formed themselves into troop greeters to avoid the situation of the Vietnam War, when soldiers returned without ceremony or greeting. The civilian-driven "ceremony of return" in Bangor has been well organized and often ebullient. In 2006, former president Bill Clinton spontaneously joined the line of troop-greeters when his private plane made a refueling stop.

21st century
In 2003, Delta Air Lines added daily connection flights to Cincinnati-Northern Kentucky International Airport and Boston Logan International Airport. In 2006, the airline added direct flights to Atlanta Hartsfield–Jackson International Airport aboard McDonnell Douglas MD-88 jets. When Delta merged with Northwest Airlines, it dropped service from Bangor to these destinations and replaced them with daily connection flights to New York–LaGuardia Airport and Detroit Wayne County Metropolitan Airport (now discontinued).

In November 2007, Allegiant Air began offering a few flights to and from Orlando–Sanford International Airport and Saint Petersburg-Clearwater International Airport, a secondary airport near Tampa.

In April 2008, the airport received a US$2.9 million grant from the Federal Aviation Administration (FAA) to upgrade the terminal building and aviation equipment. Started in June 2008 and completed in spring 2009, the construction added passenger space for gates two and three. There are also new passenger accommodations beyond the security checkpoint, including bathrooms and food and beverage vendors.

In summer 2014, Bangor International started a $10 million modernization of the main terminal's first floor. Construction was slated for completion in spring 2016.

Most regular flights out of Bangor are connections to relatively close destinations. Other kinds of service include World Airways charter flights to cities in or outside the U.S. Most World Airways flights used the Douglas DC-10 until it was replaced with McDonnell-Douglas MD-11s, which generally operate from the mostly unused International Terminal next to the busy domestic terminal.

British Airways sometimes brings charter flights from London–Heathrow on Boeing 747s or other aircraft.
 
North American Airlines, operated by Global Aviation Holdings, Inc., frequently uses Bangor International to transport U.S. troops on Boeing 767-300ERs to Europe.

On July 8, 2010, ten captured Russian spies (members of the "Illegals Program"), were deported on a government-chartered jet that took off from New York's LaGuardia Airport bound for Vienna International Airport, with a stop in Bangor for fuel.

In May 2011 Delta Air Lines, the airport's largest carrier, saw a 33% decline in passengers.

From 2010 to 2015 an average of about 470,000 passengers boarded at BGR each year.

Diversion destination

Bangor is the first major American airport encountered by airliners approaching the United States from the east and the last for airliners heading towards Europe. With a runway that is more than two miles (3.2 km) long and an uncluttered airspace, it offers a place to land in case of bad weather at an airplane's destination, bomb threats, or passengers who prove unruly or are discovered to be on the Transportation Security Administration's No Fly List. Between 2004 and May 2012, the airport handled 647 unscheduled landings: 388 for fuel, 139 for weather, 50 for medical reasons, 49 for maintenance problems, and 21 for security reasons. Because of its experience, the airport is able to quickly assemble firefighters, ambulances, police officers, and federal agents to meet such planes. During their involuntary visit to Maine, passengers receive food and donated cell phones to make calls. The airport receives $2,000 to $3,000 in handling and fuel fees, so it makes a small profit for each diverted flight.

Pilots occasionally use Bangor to prepare fuel estimates for transatlantic flights to North American destinations, since they can divert to Bangor if the fuel load proves insufficient.

Transatlantic flights are sometimes diverted to Bangor when they have mechanical trouble. Among those who have made unscheduled stops for that reason are former President George H. W. Bush and Colin Powell, and actors Clint Eastwood and Harrison Ford.

One notable security example was the September 2004 diversion for singer Cat Stevens and his daughter. In May 2001, Bangor handled two such flights from Britain within three hours. A Britannia Airways Boeing 767 to Cancún, Mexico, landed at Bangor on a Friday about noon. Three hours later, a British Airways Boeing 747 heading to Mexico City did the same.

Current service
Bangor Airport currently has up to 20 daily departures through Allegiant Air, American Airlines, Delta Air Lines and United Airlines.

Since the Iraq War, Bangor has also been busy with transcontinental and transatlantic military charter flights making refueling stops. Once in Bangor, planes will often disembark military passengers, refuel, reload the troops and take off to air bases elsewhere in the U.S. or overseas.

There have been no fatal accidents associated with commercial service at the airport since it was organized as a municipal corporation in 1969.

Airlines and destinations

Passenger

Aircraft Usage
 Allegiant Air uses A319/A320 aircraft.
 American Airlines uses A319 aircraft.
 American Eagle uses Bombardier CRJ200, CRJ700, CRJ900, Embraer E175, ERJ140 and ERJ145 aircraft.
 Delta Connection uses Bombardier CRJ700, CRJ900 aircraft.
 United Express uses Bombardier CRJ100/200, Embraer ERJ 145, and Embraer 175 aircraft.

Cargo

Statistics

Passenger ridership

Top destinations

Carrier shares

Military operations
In addition to regular operations by the 101st Air Refueling Wing of the Maine Air National Guard and other aviation operations by the Maine Army National Guard, Bangor is often the first or last stop on U.S. soil for troops headed to or from Iraq, Afghanistan or other overseas destinations.

Ground transportation
Bangor International Airport is located off I-95. The airport is served by local taxi and limousine services as well as various rental car companies.

The Community Connector provides bus service between the airport and the surrounding region. Bus services to Portland, Boston, and Northern Maine operated by Concord Coach and Cyr Bus Lines are located about one mile from the airport.

In popular culture
Bangor International Airport was the main ground setting for Stephen King's novella The Langoliers, which was made into a two-part television miniseries. The miniseries was filmed there.

See also

 Maine World War II Army Airfields

References

Further reading

Goo, Sara Kehaulani (2004-10-17). Bangor Is Used to Surprise Landings. The Washington Post. May 22, 2005.
Bangor ANGB (2005-04-26). GlobalSecurity.org. May 23, 2005.
FlyBangor.com.
Maine airport plays key role for no-fly diverted flights (2005-05-20). USA Today. May 22, 2005.

External links
Bangor International Airport (official site)

Buildings and structures in Bangor, Maine
Airports in Penobscot County, Maine
Airports established in 1923
1923 establishments in Maine